Events in the year 1851 in Chile.

Incumbents
President: Manuel Bulnes until September 18, Manuel Montt

Events
Chilean presidential election, 1851
April 20-December 31 - 1851 Chilean Revolution (also known as Revolution of 1851)
November 19 - Revolution of 1851: Combat of Monte de Urra
November 21 - Mutiny of Cambiazo
December 8 - Battle of Loncomilla

Births
6 February - Policarpo Toro (died 1921)

Deaths
April 20 - Pedro Urriola Balbontín
9 December - Ramón Freire (born 1851)

 
Chile
Chile